USS Vergana (SP-519), later OYP-519, was a United States Navy patrol vessel in commission from 1917 to 1919.

Vergana was built in 1897 as a private steel-hulled, schooner-rigged steam yacht of the same name by T. S. Marvel at Newburgh, New York, for F. S. Flower of New York City. Flower later sold her to Wilbert Melville of Los Angeles, California, who in turn sold her to stationer and printer Charles H. Crocker in either late 1916 or early 1917. By the time the United States entered World War I on 6 April 1917, she was registered at San Francisco, California, and home-ported at Belvedere Cove, California.

The U.S. Navy acquired Vergana from Crcoker in the spring of 1917 for use as a section patrol vessel during World War I. The date of her acquisition and delivery to the Navy are unclear; according to her logbook, her first commanding officer, Ensign E. Dahlgren, USNRF, reported aboard on 16 April 1917, but some sources state that she was not delivered to the Navy until 4 May 1917. She was commissioned as USS Vergana (SP-519) on 10 July 1917.

Decommissioned at the Mare Island Navy Yard at Vallejo, California, on 16 January 1919, Vergana apparently remained in reserve thereafter. When the U.S. Navy adopted its modern hull number system on 17 July 1920, she was classified as an "old district patrol craft" and redesignated OYP-519.

Vergana was ordered sold on 30 September 1921. An initial sale, of that date, was never consummated, but on 25 February 1922 she was sold to Louis A. Fracchia of Oakland, California.

References

Department of the Navy Naval History and Heritage Command Online Library of Selected Images: Civilian Ships: Vergana (Steam Yacht, 1897). Served as USS Vergana (SP-519) in 1917-1922
NavSource Online: Section Patrol Craft Photo Archive: Vergana (OYP 519) ex-SP-519

Patrol vessels of the United States Navy
World War I patrol vessels of the United States
Ships built in Newburgh, New York
1897 ships
Individual yachts